The Embassy of South Sudan in London is the diplomatic mission of South Sudan in the United Kingdom.

The embassy was formerly located at 22-25 Portman Close, London, W1H 6BS, London, in a building which was formerly home to the Cambodian embassy before that moved to Willesden Green.

Gallery

References

External links
Official site

South Sudan
Diplomatic missions of South Sudan
South Sudan–United Kingdom relations
Buildings and structures in the City of Westminster
St John's Wood